Honoring a Father's Dream: Sons of Lwala is a 2011 documentary film. Directed by Barry Simmons and produced by Mitchell Galin, David Kiern, and Barry Simmons for Epiphany Documentary Films, it follows the story of two Kenyan brothers who build a health clinic in their home village.

Plot
Milton and Fred Ochieng’ are two brothers from Lwala, Kenya whose village sent them to America to become doctors. But after losing both parents to AIDS they are left with a heartbreaking task: to return home and finish the health clinic their father started before getting sick. Unable to raise enough money on their own, the brothers are joined by students, politicians, and a rock band who launch a fund raising drive among young people across the United States.

Soundtrack
Jars of Clay wrote an original score for Honoring a Father's Dream: Sons of Lwala. The song "Prisoner of Hope," which is heard at the end of the film, was included on the Closer EP. "A Country of My Own," by Thad Cockrell is also featured in the film.

Release
Honoring a Father's Dream: Sons of Lwala was selected to screen at the 2011 Attic Film Festival.

References

External links
 
 

2011 films
American documentary films
Films about evangelicalism
2010s English-language films
2010s American films